Brymbo Institute Cricket and Football Club was a multi purpose sports club based in Brymbo, Wales.

History

The club has its roots in the establishment of the Brymbo Institute and Reading Room, set up by non-conformist and Victorian industrialist William Darby. It was not as successful as he hoped, as few steelworkers were teetotalers, whilst the Darbys were great supporters of the temperance movement and so banned the sale of alcohol from their premises and land. The steelworkers later took over the Institute and managed it themselves. The institute supported cricket, rifle, tennis and bowls clubs, financed the silver band and supplied newspapers and magazines for the reading room.

Brymbo Institute FC merged with local rivals Brymbo Green FC on 3 June 1921. The merger created a new club called Brymbo and Green United FC. The new club disbanded in 1926.

Seasons

Cup history

Honours

League
Welsh Senior League
Third : 1893, 1894

Wrexham and District League Division 2
Winners : 1909

North Wales Alliance League Division One
Third : 1920

Cups
Denbighshire and Flintshire Charity Cup	
Runner-up : 1896

Notable players
Previously or Went onto play Professional or International Football.

  Joseph Rogers – Wales International
  G.F Kelly – Wales International
  Jack Newnes – Wales International
  John Matthias – Wales International

Other information

Not to be confused with Brymbo Victoria, Brymbo Steelworks FC or Brymbo FC.

References

Defunct football clubs in Wales
Sport in Wrexham
Sport in Wrexham County Borough
Football clubs in Wrexham
North Wales Alliance League clubs